Udo Müller is a former East German slalom canoeist who competed in the 1970s. He won two medals at the 1973 ICF Canoe Slalom World Championships in Muotathal with a silver in the C-1 team event and a bronze in the C-1 event.

References

German male canoeists
Living people
Year of birth missing (living people)
Medalists at the ICF Canoe Slalom World Championships